This is a list of encyclopedias and encyclopedic/biographical dictionaries published on the subject of architecture and architects in any language. Entries are in the English language except where noted.

A

Arany, Lynne, Archie Hobson. Little museums: Over 1,000 small and not-so-small American showplaces. H. Holt, 1998. .

Association of Collegiate Schools of Architecture. Guide to architecture schools. Association of Collegiate Schools of Architecture Press, 1998. ISSN 1097-2552.

B

Banham, Joanna, Leanda Shrimpton. Encyclopedia of interior design. Fitzroy Dearborn, 1997. .
Bannister, Fletcher. History of Architecture. Butterworth, 1987.
Birnbaum, Charles A., Robin S. Karson. Pioneers of American landscape design. McGraw Hill, 2000. .

C

Campbell, Gordon. The Grove encyclopedia of classical art and architecture. Oxford University Press, 2007. .

Colvin, Howard Montagu. A biographical dictionary of British architects, 1600–1840. Yale University Press, 1995. .

Curl, James Stevens. Encyclopaedia of architectural terms. Donhead, 1997. .

D
   

National Museum of Denmark, Danske Kirker (Danish Churches), freely searchable database providing extensive details of about two thirds of Denmark's churches (57 volumes with over 37,000 pages). Contains accounts from issues published between 1933 and the present covering different regions of Denmark, available online or usually also in book form.

E
Emanuel, Muriel. Contemporary architects. St. James Press, 1994. .

Encyclopedia of World Architecture.. Facts on File, 1977.

F

Fleming, John, Hugh Honour, Nikolaus Pevsner. The Penguin dictionary of architecture and landscape architecture. Penguin, 1999. .

G
Gaither, Carl C., Alma E. Cavazos-Gaither, Andrew Slocombe. Practically speaking: A dictionary of quotations on engineering, technology, and architecture. Institute of Physics, 1999. .

Guedes, Pedro. Encyclopedia of Architectural Terminology: An Encyclopedic Survey of Changing Forms, Materials, and Concepts. McGraw-Hill, 1979.

H
Harris, Cyril M. American architecture: An illustrated encyclopedia. W.W. Norton, 1998. .

I
International Dictionary of Architects and Architecture. St. James Press, 1993.

J
Johnson, Donald Leslie, Donald Langmead. Makers of 20th century modern architecture: A bio-critical sourcebook. Greenwood Press, 1997. .

L

Lester, Walter. American Shelter: An Illustrated Encyclopedia of the American Home. Overlook Press, 1981.

M

Meister, Michael W., Madhusudan A. Dhaky American Institute of Indian Studies. Encyclopedia of Indian temple architecture. Philadelphia: American Institute of Indian Studies; University of Pennsylvania Press, 1983–. .

O

P

Penguin Dictionary of Architecture. Penguin USA, 1991.
Petersen, Andrew. Dictionary of Islamic architecture. Routledge, 1996. .

Q

R

S

Schimmelman, Janice Gayle. Architectural books in early America: Architectural treaties and building handbooks available in American libraries and bookstores through 1800. Oak Knoll Press, 1999. .

Shoemaker, Candice A., Chicago Botanic Garden. Encyclopedia of gardens: History and design. Fitzroy Dearborn, 2001. .

 Sturgis, Russell (1905). A Dictionary of Architecture and Building. New York: Macmillan. Vol. 1 (A–E), Vol. 2 (F–N), Vol. 3 (O–Z) at the Internet Archive.

T

Taylor, Patrick. The Oxford companion to the garden. Oxford University Press, 2006. .

W

 
Wilson, Dreck Spurlock. African-American architects: A biographical dictionary, 1865–1945. Routledge, 2004. .

Y

Yarwood, Doreen, Suhail Butt, Randall Van Vynckt. International dictionary of architects and architecture. St. James Press, 1993. .

Z

See also 
 Bibliography of encyclopedias

Citations

References 
Guide to Reference.  American Library Association. Retrieved 5 December 2014. (subscription required).
Kister, Kenneth F. (1994). Kister's Best Encyclopedias (2nd ed.). Phoenix: Oryx. .

Architecture
Architecture books